Comico is a webtoon portal based in Japan that is part of NHN Japan Corporation. NHN Japan first launched its webtoon platform Comico in Japan in 2013. It was then followed by a launch in Taiwan in 2014 and then in Thailand and South Korea in 2016 followed by Indonesia (now defunct  since September 30, 2019) and Spanish language (now defunct since 2019) in 2017. Comico launched its service in Vietnam in April 2020 and in July 2020 launched its English language service under the name "Pocket Comics". Comico has also stated that it will relaunch its Spanish service with the "Pocket Comics" brand later in the future. In 2017, Nielsen Media Research found it to be the second largest website for digital comics in Japan based on the number of users. The Taiwanese version of "Comico" was rebranded to the "Pocket Comics" branding soon after the launch. On January 24, 2022, NHN Japan launched French language service for Pocket Comics. That same year, a German language service was launched.

Series

Comico

Comico Japan Challenge

Comico Japan PLUS

Comico Korea

Comico Taiwan

References

External links
Comico Japan
Comico Taiwan (Defunct, moved to Pocket Comics)
Comico Korea
Comico Thailand
Comico Indonesia (Defunct)
Comico Spanish (Defunct)
Comico Vietnam
Pocket Comics

Webtoon publishing companies